Flight Guard is an Elta Systems Ltd's brand name for a family of airborne systems for protecting civilian aircraft against man-portable air-defense systems.

Description
Elta's Flight Guard is a missile detection and avoidance system that is installed on more than 200 military aircraft and helicopters as well as on several VIP commercial aircraft, and has been also installed in aircraft of the El Al, Arkia and Israir fleets that fly to high risk destinations.
 
In September 2003, a year after an attempt was made to shoot down an Arkia Israel Airlines Boeing 757 in Mombasa, Kenya in 2002 (2002 Mombasa attacks), the Israeli Ministry of Transportation selected Elta Systems to perform advanced flight tests of Flight Guard for protecting its commercial aircraft. Part of the funding was used to obtain certification of the system by Israel's Civil Aviation Authority (CAA).

The system chosen comprised a radar-based missile approach warning system (MAWS) and countermeasure dispensing system. The system was chosen since it is specifically designed to defend low-flying aircraft against MANPADs, such as those utilized in the attack in Kenya. The automated system uses doppler radar to detect incoming missiles, before firing IMI-designed civilian flares as decoys against incoming infrared-homed missiles. It was planned that the production flares used would be invisible to the human eye.

Controversy
The system has proved controversial, with both Switzerland and the FAA in the US raising fire hazard safety concerns. The Swiss have stated that any aircraft with the system installed will be grounded, despite uncovering a plot to down an El Al aircraft in that country; other European countries have indicated that they might follow suit.

Future development
Although Flight Guard was approved by the Israeli CAA and several other countries, the Israel authority decided to buy a laser-based jamming system called Multi-Spectral Infrared Countermeasure (MUSIC) which began development in 2008, that does not use flares. As of Nov 2009, few commercial aircraft have anti-aircraft missile protection systems, and these rely on flares as the countermeasure.

See also
 CAMPS
 Common Infrared Countermeasures program
 Northrop Grumman Guardian
 AN/ALQ-144 - Infrared guided missile countermeasure system
 Directional Infrared Counter Measures
 2002 Mombasa attacks - attack was co-ordinated with the shootdown attempt.
 List of airliner shootdown incidents

References

External links

 Flight Guard (Photographs and technical specifications)

Missile countermeasures
EL M 2160
Weapons countermeasures